Obadiah Sedgwick (1600?–1658) was an English clergyman of presbyterian views, and a member of the Westminster Assembly.

Life
He was son of Joseph Sedgwick, vicar of St. Peter's, Marlborough, Wiltshire, and then of Ogbourne St. Andrew, and was born at Marlborough about 1600. He matriculated at Queen's College, Oxford, on 18 June 1619, aged 19, moved to Magdalen Hall, and graduated B.A. on 5 May 1620, M.A. 23 January 1623.

He was tutor (1626) to Sir Matthew Hale. Having taken orders, he became chaplain to Horace Vere, 1st Baron Vere of Tilbury, whom he accompanied to the Low Countries. Returning to Oxford, he commenced B.D. on 16 January 1630. His first preferment (1630) in the church was as lecturer at St. Mildred's, Bread Street, London, where his puritanism got him into trouble. On 6 July 1639 he was presented by Robert Rich, 2nd Earl of Warwick, to the vicarage of Coggeshall, Essex, in succession to John Dod.

On the opening of the Long parliament he regained his lectureship at St. Mildred's, and became known as a vigorous preacher against episcopacy. In May 1642, he was one of the preachers invited to address the House of Commons at St Margaret's, Westminster. In the autumn of 1642 he was chaplain to the regiment of foot raised by Denzil Holles. He was a member of the Westminster Assembly (1643), and in the same year was appointed a licenser of the press. On 6 October 1643 he spoke at the Guildhall in favour of the league with Scotland for the prosecution of the war, and his speech was published in Foure Speeches, 1646. In a sermon of September 1644 he preached for 'cutting off delinquents.' He held for a short time the rectory of St Andrew's, Holborn, on the sequestration (13 December 1645) of John Hacket; but next year (before May 1646) he was appointed to the rectory of St. Paul's, Covent Garden, and resigned Coggeshall where John Owen succeeded him (18 August).

He was a member of the eleventh London classis in the parliamentary presbyterian system; but also on 20 March 1654 he was appointed one of Oliver Cromwell's 'triers,' and in August of the same year was a clerical assistant to the 'expurgators.' His health failing, he resigned St Paul's in 1656, and was succeeded by Thomas Manton, who is sometimes mistakenly referred to as his son-in-law. He was a man of property, being lord of the manor of Ashmansworth, Hampshire. Retiring to Marlborough, he died there at the beginning of January 1658, and was buried near his father in the chancel of Ogbourne St. Andrew. By his wife Priscilla he had a son Robert, baptised at Coggeshall on 19 October 1641, who was a frequent preacher before parliament.

Works
He published many sermons between 1639 and 1657. Besides these and a catechism, he published:

 Christ's Counsell to ... Sardis, 1640
 The Doubting Believer, 1641; 1653
England's Preservation, 1642
Haman’s Vanity, Displaying the birthlesse Issues of Church-destroying Adversaries 1643
An Arke against a Deluge: or Safety in Dangerous Times, 1644
A Thanksgiving-Sermon, 1644
The Nature and Danger of Heresies, 1647
Elisha His Lamentation, 1654
 The Humbled Sinner, 1656; 1660
 The Fountain Opened, 1657
 The Riches of Grace, 1657; 1658

Posthumous were: 
 The Shepherd of Israel, 1658
 The Parable of the Prodigal, 1660
 The Anatomy of Secret Sins, 1660
 The Bowels of Tender Mercy, 1661

Notes

References

1600s births
1659 deaths
17th-century English Anglican priests
English Presbyterian ministers of the Interregnum (England)
Westminster Divines
Alumni of The Queen's College, Oxford
Alumni of Magdalen Hall, Oxford
People from Wiltshire
People from Ashmansworth